Colfiorito is a village in Umbria, central Italy, former Catholic bishopric under its Roman name Plestia, now a frazione of the comune of Foligno and a Latin Catholic titular see.

Geography 
It is located on a plateau at 760 m over the sea level, on the road from municipal seat Foligno to Macerata, which houses a total of c. 5,000 inhabitants (part of it is under the jurisdiction of Serravalle di Chienti, Marche).

The village contains Umbria's smallest natural park.

History 
In the plateau tombs from the 10th century BC and an Iron Age village (9th century BC) have been found.
 
In 178 BC existed here the Roman city of Plestia, which had a forum, a temple and other edifices and shortly was a bishopric.

The town was abandoned in the 10th century: the site is now marked by the church of Santa Maria in Plestia.

The area was repopulated by the comune of Foligno, who built here the castle (1269) from which originated the modern village.

Colfiorito was heavily damaged by the earthquake which rocked Umbria and Marche regions on September 26, 1997.

Ecclesiastical History 
In the 5th century AD a Bishopric of Plestia was established, which was suppressed in 560, its territory being reassigned to the Diocese of Camerino.

In 950 it was restored as Diocese of Plestia, regaining its territory from the above bishopric of Camerino.

In 1006 it was again suppressed, its territory now being divided between the then dioceses of Spoleto, Foligno and Nocera Umbra.

No residential incumbents available.

Titular see 
In 1966 it was nominally restored as a Latin Titular bishopric, which has had the following incumbents, all of the lowest (episcopal) rank except the archiepiscopal first one :
 Titular Archbishop Leo Christopher Byrne (1967.07.31 – 1974.10.21)
 Bruno Foresti (1974.12.12 – 1976.04.02) (later Archbishop)
 Bolesław Filipiak (1976.05.01 – 1976.05.24); previously Dean of Sacred Roman Rota (1967.06.26 – 1976.05.01), later created Cardinal-Deacon of S. Giovanni Bosco in Via Tuscolana (1976.05.24 – death 1978.10.14)
 John Nicholas Wurm (1976.06.25 – 1981.09.19)
 Anthony Michael Milone (1981.11.10 – 1987.12.14)
 Thaddeus Joseph Jakubowski (1988.02.16 – 2013.07.14)
 Francisco José Villas-Boas Senra de Faria Coelho (2014.04.17 – 2018.06.26), Auxiliary Bishop of Braga (Portugal)
 Thomas Joseph Neylon (2021.07.06 – incumbent), Auxiliary Bishop of Liverpool

Main sights 
 Church of Santa Maria in Plestia (5th century - see description here).
 Castle of Colfiorito.
 Castelliere of Monte Orve.
 Archaeological Museum of the Umbri Plestini

Notes and references

Sources and external links
 GCatholic with titular incumbent bio links

Frazioni of the Province of Perugia
Hilltowns in Umbria
Castles in Italy
Foligno